José Omar Acevedo (born December 18, 1977) is a retired right-handed Major League Baseball pitcher who last played for the Baltimore Orioles organization. In his five-year career, Acevedo has a career record of 18–25 with an ERA of 5.74. He is a cousin of Hall of Fame pitcher Juan Marichal. He has no relation to pitcher Juan Acevedo, as he is from Mexico. Acevedo was released by the Baltimore Orioles on March 12, 2007.

References

External links

1977 births
Living people
Águilas Cibaeñas players
Charleston AlleyCats players
Chattanooga Lookouts players
Cincinnati Reds players
Clinton LumberKings players
Colorado Rockies players
Colorado Springs Sky Sox players
Dayton Dragons players
Dominican Republic expatriate baseball players in the United States

Louisville Bats players
Major League Baseball pitchers
Major League Baseball players from the Dominican Republic
Sportspeople from Santo Domingo